Jennifer Turner may refer to:

Jennifer Turner (cricketer) (born 1969), New Zealand international cricketer
Jennifer Turner (musician), singer/songwriter musician and producer